The Border Security Agency (BSA), also known as  AKSEM (Jawi: اڬيسي كاولن سمڤادن مليسيا) is a Malaysian government agency that guard the country’s entry and exit points from illegal activities such as smuggling, illegal migration and human trafficking.

History
Established in 2015, the agency manned by some 10,000 officials from the Malaysian Armed Forces, Royal Malaysia Police, General Operations Force and the Smuggling Prevention Unit (UPP).

See also 
 List of national border guard agencies

References 

Federal ministries, departments and agencies of Malaysia
Law enforcement in Malaysia
2015 establishments in Malaysia
Government agencies established in 2015